MQR may refer to

The Mennonite Quarterly Review
Michigan Quarterly Review
Midalja għall-Qadi tar-Repubblika, (Medal for Service to the Republic) post-nominal for recipients
MQR is the short form for Malkhaid Road in the Indian Railways short nomenclature station codes .